Pseudovertagus is a genus of sea snails, marine gastropod mollusks in the family Cerithiidae.

Species
Species within the genus Pseudovertagus include:

 Pseudovertagus aluco (Linnaeus, 1758)
 Pseudovertagus clava (Gmelin, 1791)
 Pseudovertagus elegans Bozzetti, 2006
 Pseudovertagus nobilis (Reeve, 1855)
 Pseudovertagus peroni Wilson, 1975
 Pseudovertagus phylarchus (Iredale, 1929)
 Species brought into synonymy
 Pseudovertagus excelsior Iredale, 1930: synonym of Pseudovertagus phylarchus (Iredale, 1929)

References

 Houbrick R.S. (1978). The family Cerithiidae in the Indo-Pacific. Part 1: the genera Rhinoclavis, Pseudovertagus and Clavocerithium. Monographs of Marine Mollusca 1: 1-130

External links

Cerithiidae